The Nashville Metropolitan Board of Parks and Recreation (commonly, Metro Parks and Recreation or Nashville Parks and Recreation) is the municipal board that is responsible for maintaining the parks system of Nashville, Tennessee, and furnishing recreational opportunities for city's residents. The Board boasts over 100 stand-alone parks and 7 municipal golf courses.

History

In 1901, Nashville Mayor James Marshall Head created the Nashville Parks Board. Nashville's first park, Watkins Park, was created in 1909. The site became known as Centennial Park.

Administration
The Park Board has seven members, appointed for five year terms. The current board is composed of:

 George Anderson, 
 Stan Fossick, 
 Dr. Michelle Steele, "vice-chair"
 Tari Hughes,"chair"
 Susannah Scott-Barnes
 Dr. Sharon Gentry, representing the Board of Education
 Jeff Haynes, representing the Planning Commission

The Parks Director, who oversees day-to-day operations, is currently Monique Odom.

Divisions of the Parks Department include Maintenance, Planning, Recreation and Community Centers, Special Services, Natural Resources and Greenways, and Park Police.

Attractions
Nashville Parks' most famous attraction is the Parthenon, based in Centennial Park, which is a full-scale replica of the original Parthenon in Athens.  It was originally built in 1897 for the Tennessee Centennial Exposition.

Nashville Parks also runs the nearby Centennial Sports Complex, which has an Olympic-sized pool, an ice rink, and a workout area.  The Complex rink is home to the Nashville Predators's practice facilities.

See also
Shelby Park
Warner Parks, home of the annual running of the Iroquois Steeplechase, Tennessee's only graded stakes race.

References

External links
Metropolitan Board of Parks and Recreation official site
Locations of Nashville Parks
Nashville Greenways Nashville Greenway System
Nashville Riverfront developing area designed to renovate the underdeveloped riverside of downtown Nashville.

Government of Nashville, Tennessee
Organizations based in Nashville, Tennessee